Comas District may refer to:
 Comas District, Lima
 Comas District, Concepción